Nikola Danihelková (born 26 July 1994) is a Czech football striker, currently playing for Hradec Králové in the Czech Women's First League.

Danihelková was voted talent of the year at the 2010 Czech Footballer of the Year (women).

She was a member of the Czech national team. She made her debut for the national team on 16 June 2012 in a match against Austria.

References

1994 births
Living people
Czech women's footballers
Czech Republic women's international footballers
Sportspeople from Hradec Králové
Women's association football forwards
AC Sparta Praha (women) players
Czech Women's First League players